Los Angeles Legends was an American women’s soccer team, founded in 2008. The team folded after the 2009 season. The team was a member of the United Soccer Leagues W-League, the second tier of women’s soccer in the United States and Canada. The team played in the Western Conference against teams from Denver, Fort Collins, Los Angeles, Seattle, Vancouver and Ventura.

The team played its home games at Cougar Stadium on the campus of Azusa Pacific University in the city of Azusa, California, 24 miles east of downtown Los Angeles. The team's colors was black and white.

The team was a sister organization of the men's Los Angeles Legends team, which plays in the USL Premier Development League.

Players
 Head Coach: Twila Kaufman
 Assistant Coach: Kristy Kieley
 Fitness Coach: Ali Malaekah
 Goalkeeper Coach: Chris Swift
 General Manager: Ramon Reid

Squad 2009

Year-by-year

References
PDL rivals add W-League teams

External links
Los Angeles Legends

Soccer clubs in Greater Los Angeles
Women's soccer clubs in California
USL W-League (1995–2015) teams
2008 establishments in California
2009 disestablishments in California
Azusa, California